Derjaguin may refer to:

Boris Derjaguin (1902–1994), Russian chemist
Derjaguin approximation, expression of force profile interaction between finite size bodies
DLVO theory, force between charged surfaces interacting through a liquid medium
DMT model of elastic contact; see Contact mechanics